Tella or talla (Amharic ጠላ;) is a traditional beer from Ethiopia. It is brewed from various grains, typically teff and sorghum. Depending on region, barley, wheat, or maize may be used; spices can also be added. Dried and ground shiny-leaf buckthorn leaves are used for fermentation. Due to the addition of bread and use of a fermentation vessel which has been smoked over dried olive wood or Abyssinian rose wood, tella may have a smoky flavour. The alcohol content of unfiltered Tella is usually around 2–4 Volume percent, filtered tella contains about 5–6 vol%.

Tella is often home-brewed. It may be offered in tella houses (tellabet), usually in regular homes, where people meet and talk to each other.

Tella was commonly used for kiddush by the Beta Israel (Ethiopian Jews). Tella was used because wine was often unavailable. Due to the availability of wine in Israel, Ethiopian-Israelis generally use wine for kiddush instead of tella.

See also

 The Tigrayan Siwa (beer) culture
Tej, an Ethiopian and Eritrean honey wine
 List of Ethiopian dishes and foods
 Eritrean cuisine

References

External links
Ethnomed Ethiopian foods
T’alla Tell-All - Ethiopian Food
Traditional Alcoholic Beverages from Ethiopia, LISSANonline.com
Boozing it up in Ethiopia, GADLING.com
On Tella, the Ethiopian beer, in .pdf format

Types of beer
Beer in Ethiopia
Eritrean cuisine
Jewish ceremonial food and drink